
Year 508 (DVIII) was a leap year starting on Tuesday (link will display the full calendar) of the Julian calendar. In the Roman Empire, it was known as the Year of the Consulship of Venantius and Celer (or, less frequently, year 1261 Ab urbe condita). The denomination 508 for this year has been used since the early medieval period, when the Anno Domini calendar era became the prevalent method in Europe for naming years.

Events 
 By place 
 Byzantine Empire 
 Emperor Anastasius I formally recognizes Clovis I of the Salian Franks, as ruler of Gaul. He sends a Byzantine fleet of 100 warships, to raid the coasts of Italy.

 Britannia 
 Battle of Netley: King Cerdic of Wessex moves with an Anglo-Saxon army inland, and defeats the British king, Nudd-Lludd (according to the Anglo-Saxon Chronicle).
 Winter – All the rivers in England are frozen for more than two months.

 Europe 
 King Clovis I fails in an effort to take the walled city of Carcassonne (Southern Gaul). He establishes Paris (Lutetia) as his capital and gets baptized, making Roman Catholicism the official religion of the Kingdom of the Franks.
 King Theodoric the Great sends an Ostrogoth army, led by his sword-bearer Theudis, drives the Franks out of Provence, and recovers Septimania (Languedoc) from the Visigoths.

Births 
 September 16 – Yuan Di, emperor of the Liang Dynasty (d. 555)
 Xiao Ji, prince of the Liang Dynasty (d. 553)

Deaths 
 Geraint, king of Dumnonia (approximate date)
Natanleod, king of Wales
 Yuan Xie, prince of the Northern Wei Dynasty
 Yujiulü Futu, ruler (khan) of the Rouran (Mongolia)

References 

Bibliography